The 1913 German Ice Hockey Championship was the second season of the German Ice Hockey Championship, the national championship of Germany. Berliner Schlittschuhclub won the championship by defeating MTV Munchen 1879 in the final.

First round

South

1st round

2nd round

3rd round

North

Final

References

External links
German ice hockey standings 1912-1932
Ger
German Ice Hockey Championship seasons